Euryparasitus is a genus of mites in the family Ologamasidae. There are about 15 described species in Euryparasitus.

Species
These 15 species belong to the genus Euryparasitus:

 Euryparasitus calcarator (Banks, 1910)
 Euryparasitus changanensis Gu & Huang, 1992
 Euryparasitus citelli Bai & G.u.Chen, 1988
 Euryparasitus davydovae Bondarchuk & Buyakova, 1978
 Euryparasitus emarginatus (Koch, 1839)
 Euryparasitus goncharovi Bondarchuk & Buyakova, 1976
 Euryparasitus laxiventralis Gu & Guo, 1995
 Euryparasitus longicheta Bondarchuk & Buyakova, 1978
 Euryparasitus maseri Hagele, Kaufman, Whitaker & Klompen, 2005
 Euryparasitus medius Zuevsknj, 1971
 Euryparasitus occidentalis Hagele, Kaufman, Whitaker & Klompen, 2005
 Euryparasitus pagumae Ishikawa, 1988
 Euryparasitus taojiangensis Ma, 1982
 Euryparasitus tori Davydova, 1970
 Euryparasitus tragardhi Bregetova, 1977

References

Ologamasidae
Articles created by Qbugbot